Mickey Oliver is an American musician, who was born on the South Side of Chicago. He was instrumental in popularizing house music. As a founding member of the mix show team on Chicago radio station 102.7 WBMX, collectively known as the Hot Mix 5 became the President of the group.
The Hot Mix 5 became a leading force in the early Chicago house music scene and the first to air the new sound. The show garnered over 2 million listeners which is a record for a major market radio that stands today.

The City of Chicago recognized Mickey's accomplishments by naming a street after him, “Mickey Mixin Oliver Blvd”. Its location is on Belmont Avenue in WrigleyVille.
One of his first releases, "In-Ten-Si-T" (1988), which was co-written and produced by Jim "Cheese" Romano, is considered one of the Top 10 most influential House music records. In 1987, he produced "Never Let Go", which became a hit. Oliver's works continue to be remixed and re-released by producers/artists all over the world.

In 2011, Oliver charted on Billboard Magazine's Dance Music Club Play chart with his single release "As Days Go By" featuring Baton Rouge (LA) singer Kim Smith on the Intensi-T label. The song debuted at #46 on the chart on January 22, 2011 and peaked at #16. That chart success seemed to remind the dance music industry of Oliver's abilities as it opened the door to more remixing opportunities. Oliver remixed the single "Zoon Baloomba" which topped out on the Billboard chart at #21 on November 18, 2012.
 
In the year 2010 Mickey Oliver debuted his Las Vegas Theatrical show, Intensit-T at the Planet Hollywood complex on the Vegas strip. Starring in this Dance Revue variety show, Intensit-T showcased how House Music influenced other genres of music. In that same year Mickey also produced and starred on an ABC Las Vegas TV show called Intensi-T TV. This 10-episode entertainment/variety show premiered after the desperate housewives series and later after the Jimmy Kimmel show. Intensit-T TV uncovered the Las Vegas culture as well as had a weekly sketch comedy routine. The show garnered an underground fan club and still to this day can be seen on Roku on demand.

Mickey Oliver also produced a lighthearted musical called "Revolution Chicago" which is the story of how House Music grew out from the streets of Chicago into a worldwide lifestyle. Revolution Chicago premiered in September 2019.

Oliver continues to work as a DJ, producer, remixer and television show creator.

References

External links
 Mickey Oliver official website

Year of birth missing (living people)
Living people
American DJs
Club DJs
American house musicians
Remixers
Electro house musicians
Electronic dance music DJs